Kəlbənd (also, Kel’bend, Kel’vend, and Kyal’byand”) is a village and municipality in the Ismailli Rayon of Azerbaijan.  It has a population of 812.  The municipality consists of the villages of Kəlbənd, Qırmızı Oktyabr, Şükürçü, and Kirk.

References 

Populated places in Ismayilli District